Syrtlanovo (Sırtlan) is a rural locality (a village) in Gafuriysky Selsoviet, Buzdyaksky District, Bashkortostan, Russia. The population was 35 as of 2010. There is 1 street.

Geography 
Syrtlanovo is located 9 km southeast of Buzdyak (the district's administrative centre) by road. Gafuri is the nearest rural locality.

References 

Rural localities in Buzdyaksky District